Thomas Erndl (born 22 July 1974) is a German politician of the Christian Social Union (CSU) who has been serving as a member of the Bundestag since 2017. He is the Deputy Chairman of the Foreign Affairs Committee and a member of the Defense Committee. Mr Erndl is also the Spokesman for International Polics and Security of the CSU Party in the Bundestag.

Early life and career 
Erndl was born in Osterhofen, Bavaria. In 1996, he completed his military service with the Implementation Force (IFOR) in Bosnia and Herzegovina. After completing his studies at Regensburg University of Applied Sciences, he worked at NXP Semiconductors.

Political career 
Erndl is a member of the CSU since 1991 and engaged in local politics since 1993. In the 2017 German federal election, he stood successfully for election to the Bundestag, representing the Deggendorf electoral district (Wahlkreis 227) in Lower Bavaria. He won 41.1% of the first preference votes. 

In parliament, Erndl has been a member in the Committee on Foreign Affairs (since 2018) and the Subcommittee on International Climate and Energy Policy (since 2022). From 2018 to 2021, he chaired the Subcommittee on Foreign Cultural and Educational Policy. 

In addition to his work in parliament, Erndl serves as deputy president of the Reservist Association of Deutsche Bundeswehr.

References

External links 

  
 Bundestag biography 

1974 births
Living people
Members of the Bundestag for Bavaria
Members of the Bundestag 2021–2025
Members of the Bundestag 2017–2021
People from Deggendorf (district)
Members of the Bundestag for the Christian Social Union in Bavaria